Scopula froitzheimi is a moth of the family Geometridae. It is endemic to  Afghanistan.

References

Moths described in 1967
froitzheimi
Endemic fauna of Afghanistan
Moths of Asia